Tommy Wildcat (born May 3, 1967) is a Native American musician and academic.

Background
Cherokee Nation National Treasure Tommy Wildcat is of Cherokee, Natchez and Muscogee heritage and is an enrolled citizen of the Cherokee Nation. His parents are Annie and the late Tom Webber Wildcat. His father was one of the last speakers of the Natchez language. He also has a twin sister named Tammy. Tommy graduated from Sequoyah High School 1985, and he is a 2014 graduate of Northeastern State University in Tahlequah, Oklahoma. His Bachelor's Degree included a Major in Cherokee Cultural Studies and a Minor in American Indian Studies. His family appeared in National Geographic magazine's September 2005 issue, where one photo showed Tommy holding his young nephew, Skylar Wildcat. His father Tom Wildcat was designated a Cherokee National Treasure in 1995 for his skill in making turtle shell shakers. Tommy was featured in the American Express commercial Charge Against Hunger 1995, which aired during the Beatles Anthology.

Music

A self-taught composer of flute songs, Tommy has learned traditional vocal songs of his tribe from his father, Tom W. Wildcat.

Tommy Wildcat's company, A Warrior's Production, has produced four full-length albums. His first was released in 1995, including Tom Richard's The Real Outdoors on the Nashville Network.

References

1967 births
Living people
People from Tahlequah, Oklahoma
Cherokee Nation artists
Natchez people
Muscogee people
Native American flautists
Musicians from Oklahoma
20th-century Native Americans
21st-century Native Americans